Fortney Hillman Stark Jr. (November 11, 1931 – January 24, 2020), known as Pete Stark, was an American businessman and politician who was a member of the United States House of Representatives from 1973 to 2013. A Democrat from California, Stark's district— during his last two decades in Congress—was in southwestern Alameda County and included Alameda, Union City, Hayward, Newark, San Leandro, San Lorenzo, and Fremont (his residence during the early part of his tenure), as well as parts of Oakland and Pleasanton. At the time he left office in 2013, he was the fifth most senior Representative, as well as sixth most senior member of Congress overall. He was also the dean of California's 53-member Congressional delegation, and the only openly atheist member of Congress.

After 2010 redistricting, Stark's district was renumbered as the 15th district for the 2012 election. He narrowly finished first in the primary ahead of fellow Democrat Eric Swalwell, but lost to Swalwell in the general election. He was the second-longest serving U.S. Congressman, after Jack Brooks (D-Texas, 1994), to lose a general election.

Early life, education, and banking career 
Stark was born on November 11, 1931, in Milwaukee, Wisconsin, the son of Dorothy M. and Fortney Hillman Stark. He was of German and Swiss descent.

He received a Bachelor of Science degree in general engineering at the Massachusetts Institute of Technology in 1953. He served in the United States Air Force from 1955 to 1957. After leaving the Air Force, Stark attended the Haas School of Business at the University of California, Berkeley, and received his MBA in 1960.

In 1963, Stark founded Security National Bank, based in Walnut Creek. He described it as "a bank whose sole purpose was to fulfill the financial needs of working people." It was reportedly the first in the country to offer free checking. While Stark grew up as a Republican, his opposition to the Vietnam War led him to switch parties in the mid-1960s. He printed cheques with peace signs on them and placed a giant peace sign on the roof of his bank's headquarters. In 1971, Stark was elected to the Common Cause National Governing Board. Stark sold his interest in the bank for millions in 1972 when he was elected to the House of Representatives.

U.S. House of Representatives

Elections
In 1972, at the age of 41, Stark ran in the Democratic primary against 14-term incumbent U.S. Representative and octogenarian George Paul Miller of Alameda in what was then the 8th district. He won the Democratic primary with 56% of the vote, a 34-point margin. In the 1972 United States House of Representatives elections, he defeated Republican Lew Warden with 53% of the vote. He did not face another contest nearly that close until 2012, and was re-elected 18 times.

Stark was unopposed for the Democratic nomination in the 2008 election and was re-elected in the general election with 76.5% of the vote.

He faced his first Democratic challenger in 2010, and the challenger showed weakening support for Stark, gathering 16% of the primary votes without any endorsements.

In the 2012 United States House of Representatives elections, Stark's district was renumbered as California's 15th congressional district. Because of California's new nonpartisan blanket primary, which allows the general election to be contested by the two highest vote-getters in the primary regardless of party affiliation, his opponent in the general election was Dublin city councilman Eric Swalwell, a fellow Democrat who was almost half a century Stark’s Junior. During the campaign, the Stark campaign circulated a flyer associating Swalwell with the Tea Party movement, a characterization rejected by both the Swalwell campaign and Josh Richman of the San Jose Mercury News. In the general election, Swalwell defeated Stark with 52% of the vote.

Tenure
At 40 years (as of the end of service on January 3, 2013), Stark had been the longest-serving member of Congress from California, serving continuously from January 3, 1973, through January 3, 2013. The Hayward Area Historical Society is the repository of Stark's papers from his tenure.

Fiscal policy
Stark voted against the Food, Conservation, and Energy Act of 2008, which was supported by most House Democrats and over half of House Republicans, in part because of its cost.

Stark voted both times against the Emergency Economic Stabilization Act of 2008, which created the Troubled Asset Relief Program. Stark strongly criticized the bank bailout legislation. He said he was " one of the few members on my side of the aisle to vote against the TARP bill both times....because I believed that it rewarded the very entities that built the financial house of cards that has come crashing down."

Stark supported a 0.005% financial transaction tax applying to "trades of stocks, bonds, foreign exchange, futures and options involving large-scale traders who make more than $10,000 in transactions" annually. In 2010, he introduced a bill, the Investing in Our Future Act, that would create such a tax. The bill proposed using the revenue raised to invest in climate change adaptation, child care programs, and a Global Health Trust Fund to combat diseases, such as HIV/AIDS, malaria, and tuberculosis.

Health care
Stark had a longstanding interest in health care issues and was critical of the health insurance coverage in the United States during the George W. Bush administration. With John Conyers, in April 2006, Stark brought an action against President Bush and others alleging violations of the United States Constitution in the passing of the Deficit Reduction Act of 2005, which cut Medicaid payments. The case, Conyers v. Bush, was dismissed for lack of standing in November 2006.

In January 1985, Stark became Chairman of the Ways and Means Health Subcommittee with jurisdiction over Medicare and national health insurance proposals. Over the years, he used Budget Reconciliation bills to add amendments to impact health care. An amendment to the Consolidated Omnibus Budget Reconciliation Act of 1985 (COBRA) required many employers to offer continuation health insurance coverage in many different situations (divorce, separation from employment, etc.) Over the years, tens of millions of Americans have used this COBRA law to continue health coverage. In 1986, he led in amending that year's budget bill to include the Emergency Medical Treatment and Active Labor Act, which requires hospitals to treat and stabilize persons presenting at emergency rooms with emergency conditions or in active labor, regardless of the person's insurance status or ability to pay. In 1988, Stark introduced an "Ethics in Patient Referrals Act" bill concerning physician self-referrals. Some of the ideas in the bill became law as part of the Omnibus Budget Reconciliation Act of 1990. What is referred to as "Stark I" prohibited a physician referring a Medicare patient to a clinical laboratory if the physician or his/her family member has a financial interest in that laboratory. It was codified in the United States Code, Title 42, Section 1395nn (42 U.S.C. 1395nn, "Limitation on certain physician referrals").

The Omnibus Budget Reconciliation Act of 1993 contained what is known as "Stark II" amendments to the original law. "Stark II" extended the "Stark I" provisions to Medicaid patients and to DHS other than clinical laboratory services.

The Centers for Medicare and Medicaid Services has issued rules in the Federal Register to implement Stark Law, including a 2001 "Phase I" final rule, a 2004 "Phase II" interim final rule, and a 2007 "Phase III" final rule.

Over the years, Stark worked with others, notably his Republican counterpart, Bill Gradison (Ohio), and Representatives Henry Waxman, George Miller, and Senator Ted Kennedy, to advance health improvement ideas. Stark led in introducing bills to allow more people to buy into Medicare at an earlier age, to expand Medicare by allowing all infants to enroll in Medicare, and to provide a prescription drug benefit in Medicare. In his work on the Clinton health care plan of 1993, Stark developed, and continued to promote the basic ideas now part of the Affordable Care Act and in various Medicare for Americans ideas: all Americans should have good, basic health insurance; if they don't have such coverage, they should buy it, and if they can't afford it, they should get government subsidies to make it affordable.

In 2010, Stark's seniority would have placed him in line for the chairmanship of the Ways and Means committee, when Charlie Rangel was forced by ethics charges to step down. However Stark only held the chairmanship for one day, as Democrats instead voted for Sander Levin to take over.

Iraq War

Stark was an early opponent of the Iraq War, speaking on the floor against the resolution authorizing military force against Iraq, on October 10, 2002. In part, he said: 

In January 2003, Stark supported a reinstatement of the draft, partly in protest against the call to war but also saying, "If we're going to have these escapades, we should not do it on the backs of poor people and minorities." In October 2004, he was one of only two members of Congress to vote in favor of the Universal National Service Act of 2003 (HR 163), a bill proposing resumption of the military draft.

He did not vote for any bills to continue funding the Iraq war, but voted 'present' for some. In a statement posted on his website he explained, "Despite my utmost respect for my colleagues who crafted this bill, I can't in good conscience vote to continue this war. Nor, however, can I vote 'No' and join those who think today's legislation goes too far toward withdrawal. That's why I'm making the difficult decision to vote 'present'."

Atheism

Stark was the first openly atheist member of Congress, as announced by the Secular Coalition for America. Stark acknowledged that he was an atheist in response to an SCA questionnaire sent to public officials in January 2007.

On September 20, 2007, Stark reaffirmed that he was an atheist by making a public announcement in front of the Humanist Chaplaincy at Harvard, the Harvard Law School Heathen Society, and various other atheist, agnostic, secular, humanist, and nonreligious groups. The American Humanist Association named him 2008 Humanist of the Year, and he served on the AHA Advisory Board. On February 9, 2011, Stark introduced a bill to Congress designating February 12, 2011, as Darwin Day; this was a collaboration between Stark and the American Humanist Association. The resolution states, "Charles Darwin is a worthy symbol of scientific advancement ... and around which to build a global celebration of science and humanity."

In 2011, he and eight other lawmakers voted to reject the existing national motto, “In God We Trust." The next year, Eric Swalwell, his challenger in the Democratic primary campaign, criticized him for this vote.

Stark served on the Advisory Board of the Secular Coalition for America.

Committee assignments
 Committee on Ways and Means
 Subcommittee on Health (Ranking Member)
 Subcommittee on Income Security and Family Support

Caucuses
 Congressional Progressive Caucus
 Congressional Asian Pacific American Caucus (Associate Member)
 International Conservation Caucus

Controversies

Controversial statements
On October 18, 2007, Stark made the following comments on the House floor during a debate with Congressman Joe Barton of Texas: 

Following the initial criticism to his statements, when asked by a radio station if he would take back any of his statements, Stark responded "Absolutely not. I may have dishonored the Commander-in-Chief, but I think he's done pretty well to dishonor himself without any help from me." The same day, his office also issued a press release, saying in part: "I have nothing but respect for our brave men and women in uniform and wish them the very best. But I respect neither the Commander-in-Chief who keeps them in harms way nor the chickenhawks in Congress who vote to deny children health care”.

Five days later, on October 23, after the House voted down a censure resolution against Stark sponsored by Minority Leader John Boehner, he said: 

In 1991, he singled out "Jewish colleagues" for blame for the Gulf War, claiming they voted for it "as a matter of convenience" to help Israel and referring to Congressman Stephen Solarz of New York, who co-sponsored the Gulf War Authorization Act, as "Field Marshal Solarz in the pro-Israel forces".

In 1995, during a private meeting with Congresswoman Nancy Johnson of Connecticut, he called Johnson a "whore for the insurance industry" and suggested that her knowledge of health care came solely from "pillow talk" with her husband, a physician. His press secretary, Caleb Marshall, defended him in saying, "He didn't call her a 'whore', he called her a 'whore of the insurance industry.'"

In a 2001 Ways and Means Subcommittee on Health hearing on abstinence promotion, he referred to Congressman J. C. Watts of Oklahoma as "the current Republican Conference Chairman, whose children were all born out of wedlock."

In 2003, when Stark was told to "shut up" by Congressman Scott McInnis of Colorado during a Ways and Means Committee meeting due to Stark's belittling of the chairman, Bill Thomas of California, he replied, "You think you are big enough to make me, you little wimp? Come on. Come over here and make me, I dare you. You little fruitcake."

In a 2008 interview with documentarian Jan Helfeld, Stark stated that the size of the national debt is a reflection of the nation's wealth. When pressed if the nation should take on more debt in order to have more wealth, Stark threatened Helfeld: "You get the fuck out of here or I'll throw you out the window."

On August 27, 2009, Stark suggested that his moderate Democratic colleagues were "brain dead" for proposing changes to the America's Affordable Health Choices Act of 2009 being considered by Congress. During a conference call, Stark said that they: 

During a town hall meeting in September 2009, a constituent who opposed President Barack Obama's health care plan told Stark, "Mr. Congressman, don't pee on my leg and tell me it's raining." Stark responded with, "I wouldn't dignify you by peeing on your leg. It wouldn't be worth wasting the urine."

Real estate taxes
Stark bought $1.7 million waterfront home in Harwood, Anne Arundel County, Maryland, in 1988, and spent most of his time there in the latter part of his congressional tenure. However, he continued to claim a house in Fremont as his official residence, and visited his Bay Area district twice a month. Following his retirement from public office, he remained in Maryland.

For two years, in 2007 and 2008, Stark allegedly claimed the Harwood house as his primary residence, claiming a homestead exemption that reduced his real estate taxes by $3,853. Under Maryland law, to qualify, the owner must register to vote and drive in Maryland; Stark was registered in California despite living in Maryland for two-thirds of the year. The United States House Committee on Ethics began an investigation and in January 2010, it voted unanimously to clear Stark of any wrongdoing.

Electoral history

Death
Stark died at his home in Harwood, Maryland, on January 24, 2020, at the age of 88 from leukemia. His successor in Congress, Eric Swalwell, issued a statement:

References

External links

  official U.S. House website (archived)
 
 
 

1931 births
2020 deaths
20th-century American politicians
21st-century American politicians
American Unitarian Universalists
American atheists
American bankers
American humanists
American people of German descent
American people of Swiss descent
Deaths from cancer in Maryland
Deaths from leukemia
Democratic Party members of the United States House of Representatives from California
Haas School of Business alumni
MIT School of Engineering alumni
Military personnel from California
Military personnel from Milwaukee
People from Danville, California
People from Fremont, California
Politicians from Milwaukee
San Francisco Bay Area politicians
United States Air Force officers